The Corrida de Houilles, officially Corrida pédestre internationale de Houilles (Houilles International Footrace), is an annual 10K run that takes place at the end of December in Houilles, France. 

The competition was created in 1972 by Alexandre Joly, a French politician who would later become Mayor of Houilles. He was inspired by the Saint Silvester Road Race in São Paulo and decided to set up his own local race in his hometown with the same format – hosting the race on New Year's Eve. Due to the race's growing popularity, the competition was divided into two segments: an elite-level race and a public race.

Annick Loir was the first known women's winner in 1975, but a separate women's division (over around ) was not formally established until 1983. The date of the race has not always been 31 December due to organisational restrictions, but it is usually held within the final days of the year. No race was held in 1999 due to Cyclone Lothar and Martin. The races for 2000 and 2005 were held on New Year's Day instead. The competition gained IAAF Bronze Label Road Race status in 2013 and IAAF Silver Label Road Race status in 2014.

Top level athletes from both France and abroad have competed in Houilles. Jacky Boxberger had much success in the early days of the race, amassing four wins in the late 1970s and early 1980s. Morocco's Khalid Skah had a record eight wins from 1988 to 1997. Ethiopia's Ayelech Worku is the most successful woman at the race, having won four times consecutively from 1995 to 1998. Anpther Ethiopian woman had three straight wins from 2003 to 2006 Merima Denboba and Kenya's Micah Kogo achieved the same feat on the men's side from 2006 to 2008. The course records are 27:12 minutes for men (set by Daniel Ebenyo in 2019) and 30:32 minutes for women (set by Norah Jeruto in 2019).

Past winners
Key:

References

List of winners
Festou, Michel (2014-01-09). Corrida de Houilles 10 km. Association of Road Racing Statisticians. Retrieved on 2014-02-23.

External links
Official website

10K runs
Recurring sporting events established in 1972
Sport in Yvelines
New Year celebrations
December events
Annual sporting events in France
1972 establishments in France
Winter events in France